Eastern Kings is a municipality that holds community status in Prince Edward Island, Canada. It was incorporated in 1974.

Demographics 

See also 
List of communities in Prince Edward Island

References 

Communities in Kings County, Prince Edward Island
Rural municipalities in Prince Edward Island